Mohammad Aslam Khokhar (5 January 1920 – 22 January 2011) was a Pakistani cricketer who played in one Test in 1954. In the Second Test in England he batted at number nine, scoring 16 and 18.

He played in 45 first-class matches between 1938–39 and 1963–64, and scored the first ever century in first-class cricket in Pakistan when, batting for Punjab against Sind in December 1947, he made 117. He also umpired 3 Tests in the 1970s.

He was born in Lahore, Punjab to a Khokhar family and was a cousin of Anwar Hussain Khokhar. He died in a Lahore hospital after a prolonged illness, on 22 January 2011. Before his death, he was Pakistan's oldest surviving Test cricketer.

References

External links
 Aslam Khokhar at Cricket Archive
 Aslam Khokhar at Cricinfo

1920 births
2011 deaths
Pakistan Test cricketers
Pakistani cricketers
Pakistani Test cricket umpires
Muslims cricketers
Northern India cricketers
Pakistan Railways cricketers
North Zone (Pakistan) cricketers
Punjab (Pakistan) cricketers
Central Zone (Pakistan) cricketers
Cricketers from Lahore